Hardware is a British sitcom that aired on ITV from 2003 to 2004. Starring Martin Freeman, it was written and created by Simon Nye, the creator of Men Behaving Badly and directed by Ben Kellett.

The show's opening theme was "A Taste of Honey" by Herb Alpert's Tijuana Brass.

Cast
Martin Freeman - Mike
Peter Serafinowicz - Kenny
Ken Morley - Rex
Ryan Cartwright - Steve
Susan Earl - Anne
Ella Kenion - Julie
Iain Pearson - Brian McCampion

Plot
Hardware is set in "Hamway's Hardware Store" in London, where main character Mike (Martin Freeman) works with Steve (Ryan Cartwright) and Kenny (Peter Serafinowicz) for shop owner Rex (Ken Morley). They relax at the next-door-but-one cafe, "Nice Day Cafe", where Mike's girlfriend Anne (Susan Earl) works with Julie (Ella Kenion). The series revolves around the store staff as they engage in a daily wisecrack battle with packs of DIY obsessed clients.

The exterior scenes were filmed at 237 and 241 Neasden Lane in Neasden.

Episodes

Series Overview

Series 1: 23 March 2003 to 27 April 2003 (6 Episodes)
Series 2: 7 March 2004 to 11 April 2004 (6 Episodes)

Series 1 (2003)
"Nice" (23 March 2003)
"Naked" (30 March 2003)
"Bondage" (6 April 2003)
"Finger" (13 April 2003)
"Women" (20 April 2003)
"Hutch" (27 April 2003)

Series 2 (2004)
"Bastard" (7 March 2004)
"Big Foot" (14 March 2004)
"Nude" (21 March 2004)
"Loser" (28 March 2004)
"Tony Two-Ways" (4 April 2004)
"Celebrity" (11 April 2004)

DVD releases
The first series of Hardware is available on DVD in Region 4 (Australia). The complete series of Hardware was released in February 2009 in the UK on Region 2 from Network DVD.

Notes

References
Mark Lewisohn, "Radio Times Guide to TV Comedy", BBC Worldwide Ltd, 2003
Hardware at British TV Comedy

External links
Hardware at bbc.co.uk
 

2003 British television series debuts
2004 British television series endings
2000s British sitcoms
ITV sitcoms
Television series set in shops
Television series by Fremantle (company)
Television shows set in London
English-language television shows
Television shows produced by Thames Television